The Vauxhall of Brussels, otherwise known as the Waux-Hall, is a historic building in Brussels Park in Brussels, Belgium. It is named after the pleasure gardens of Vauxhall in London, which only became known to the inhabitants of Brussels in 1761, when a ballet entitled Le Phaxal was put on at the Theatre of La Monnaie. In Paris, the stage-builder Torré opened a "garden of amusements" in 1764, which the public came to call the Vaux-Hall de Torré. A Vaux-Hall d'hiver ("Winter Vauxhall") was set up in 1769 at the Foire Saint-Germin.

The history of the Brussels' Vauxhall is intimately linked to that of the Royal Park Theatre. It was opened in 1781 by Alexandre Bultos and his brother Herman Bultos (co-directors of La Monnaie and of the Park Theatre). It was initially a drinking palace, concert hall and theatre. Since 1818, it has been the property of the City of Brussels. It has been used by the arts and literature club Cercle Gaulois and its predecessors, as a venue for meetings, dinners, exhibitions and concerts.

References

External links
History of the Cercle gaulois and the Vauxhall 

1781 establishments in the Habsburg monarchy
1781 establishments in the Holy Roman Empire
Establishments in the Austrian Netherlands
Buildings and structures in Brussels
Culture in Brussels
Parks in Brussels
Concert halls in Belgium
Theatres in Belgium
City of Brussels
18th century in Brussels